Claas Hugo Humbert (5 August 1830, in Bielefeld – 26 May 1904) was a German scientist and writer.

External links
 

1830 births
1904 deaths
19th-century French writers
Writers from North Rhine-Westphalia
19th-century German writers
19th-century German male writers
19th-century French male writers
Scientists from Bielefeld